The Locust is the third release by The Locust. It was released on Gold Standard Laboratories in March 1997.

The Locust is The Locust's first recording that relies heavily on keyboards and synthesizers, combined with their powerviolence style, influenced mainly by Crossed Out. This is the sound for which The Locust has since become known.

In 2004, the EP was remastered and re-issued on 3" CD and 7" vinyl, and included two bonus tracks.

Track listing

Side A
 "Halfway to a Worthless Ideal Arrangement (An Interlude to a Discontinued Sarcastic Harmony... Yea Whatever)" – 0:44
 "Prepare to Qualify" – 0:31
 "Kill Roger Hedgecock" – 0:46
 "Pain Reliever" – 0:27
 "Off by a Long Shot" – 0:42

Side B
 "Cattle Mutilation" – 0:27
 "#99" – 1:19
 "Head Hits Concrete" – 0:27
 "Hairspray Suppository" – 0:43
 "Ass Gravity"  – 0:47
 "Keep Off the Tracks"  – 0:33

Personnel
David Astor
Robert Bray
James LaValle
Justin Pearson

References

1997 EPs
The Locust albums
Gold Standard Laboratories EPs